Soho TMD is a railway traction maintenance depot situated in Smethwick, West Midlands, England. It is located in Smethwick's industrial area of Soho on the boundary with Birmingham, its depot code is SO.

Operations

Soho is operated by West Midlands Trains having been transferred over from the former London Midland franchise in 2017. Before that it was operated by Central Trains until 11 November 2007. 

It is the home depot for WMT's Class 323 EMU fleet, where most maintenance of the units takes place, it is also used to stable  EMUs.

References

Sources

Railway depots in England
Rail transport in Birmingham, West Midlands